Makhnivka (- Makhnivka) is a village in Khmilnyk Raion of Vinnytsia Oblast, Ukraine, located on the west bank of the Hnylopiat River. It was named Komsomolske ( - Komsomolskoye) in 1935–2016. Prior to the establishment of the Soviet regime the place was considered to be a town.

Geography
It is located in forest steppe zone of the Dnieper Upland. The former town is near a wide spot in the Hnylopiat river, a tributary of Teteriv River where several small streams feed into it from both sides.

Name
The original name of the town was Makhnovka (pronounced Makhnivka in Ukrainian). During the Soviet period in 1935–2016 it was named Komsomolskoye (Komsomolske in Ukrainian), honoring the Lenin's Communist League of Young People Komsomol. Voted by the village council in 2001, the original name was finally restored in 2016.

There are at least four other populated places with the same name in Ukraine.

History

The first mention of the village is in the beginning of 15th century when progenitor of the Tyszkiewicz family received it from the Grand Duke of Lithuania Svidrigailo.

Machnowka Hasidic center
The first mention of Jews in Makhnivka came in 1648, in an account from the Cossack-Polish War (1648–57), when Chmielnicki's Cossacks attacked the local fortress and murdered a number of Poles and Jews. Over 100 years later, in 1765, six Jews are recorded in Makhnivka.

Upon the Partition of Poland, territories including western Ukraine were annexed into the Russian Empire. Orthodox Tsarist Russia, which was intolerant of Jews, suddenly acquired a significant Jewish population in the territories annexed from Catholic Poland. As a result, the Pale of Settlement was created, generally restricting Jews to living in the new territories, but not in "Russia proper". Jews during this period had a generally harder time, at best being isolated, and at worst being visited with pogroms. In the census of 1897, the village of Makhnivka had 2,435 Jews out of a total population of 5,343 (about 45%).

On an 1845 Russian map, "Machnowka" was the chief city of the Machnowka uyezd in Kiev guberniya, while Berdychiv was just a small town in Zhytomyr county (uyezd) of Volhynian Governorate (gubernia). When the railroads were developed (some time after 1860), the railroad went through Berdychiv and Koziatyn ( east of Makhnivka), but bypassed Makhnivka. This caused Makhnivka to decline, while both Berdychiv and Koziatyn grew. Sometime around the turn of the century, Berdychiv was separated from Volhynian Governorate and joined to Kiev Governorate, replacing Makhnivka as the chief city of the county (which was renamed from the Makhnovka county to the Berdichev county).

By the outbreak of World War II in 1939, the Jewish population of Makhnivka had dwindled to 843. The Germans captured the town on 14 July 1941 and on 9 Sept. executed 835 Jews in the Zhezhelevsk forest  from Komsomolske.

A Hasidic dynasty was established in Makhnivka in the early 20th century. It continues to flourish in Israel.

Makhnivka was previously located in Koziatyn Raion until it was abolished and its territory was merged into Khmilnyk Raion on 18 July 2020 as part of the administrative reform of Ukraine, which reduced the number of raions of Vinnytsia Oblast to six.

Notable people
 Volodymyr Antonovych

In the village is buried Polish song writer Tomasz Padura who is being assumed as an author of Polish-Ukrainian song Hej Sokoly (Hey, Falcons) about Cossacks of Ukraine.

See also
 Machnovka (Hasidic dynasty)

References

 Shtetlinks:Makhnovka

Berdichevsky Uyezd
Shtetls
Holocaust locations in Ukraine
Villages in Khmilnyk Raion